Seeking Justice (also known as Justice, and formerly titled The Hungry Rabbit Jumps) is a 2011 action thriller film starring Nicolas Cage, January Jones and Guy Pearce. The film was directed by Roger Donaldson and produced by Tobey Maguire, Ram Bergman and James D. Stern. Filming took place in New Orleans. The first trailer was released in September 2011.

Plot

In New Orleans, Will Gerard (Nicolas Cage) is a humble English teacher at Rampart High School. Will's best friend Jimmy (Harold Perrineau) also works at the school. Will's wife Laura (January Jones) is a musician who is in a local orchestra. One night, after a performance, Laura is beaten and brutally raped by a stranger named Hodge (Alex Van).

At the hospital, while Will is waiting for news about Laura's condition, Jimmy tells a distraught Will that he is confident that the rapist will be found. A stranger who calls himself Simon (Guy Pearce) tells Will that he represents an organization that deals with criminals the justice system has not. Simon describes his group as "a few citizens seeking justice." He says Hodge was paroled three weeks before his attack on Laura, that he has raped other women before, and that he will do it again.

Simon proposes an intriguing offer; in exchange for a favor from Will to be determined later, Simon will arrange to have a complete stranger make Hodge pay for Laura's rape. This would spare Will and Laura a drawn-out trial, which would make Laura suffer even more than she already has by repeatedly forcing her to relive the rape, and to be traumatized by defense attorneys. Distraught and grief-stricken, Will consents to the deal. Hodge is killed, and a picture of Hodge's body, along with a necklace that Hodge took from Laura during the rape, are sent to Will as proof. The organization's code phrase is: "The hungry rabbit jumps."

Six months later, Simon returns. He wants Will to follow a woman and her two children to the zoo and to look out for a man. If Will sees this man, he must call a number attached to a picture. Will agrees, hoping this will fulfill his debt. Simon, however, continues to call Will, asking him to continue what he is doing, claiming the man is a sex offender. Having no choice, as Simon promises to exact revenge if he does not obey, a reluctant Will agrees. He is instructed to kill the man on a pedestrian walkway that is under a high overpass by "accidentally" bumping him off it to his death, making it look like suicide.

Instead of killing the man, Will decides to see if the man has any knowledge of Simon. The man, already paranoid, becomes suspicious that Will is there to kill him. He throws his bicycle at Will. As they struggle, the man falls off the walkway despite Will's efforts to save him. The man lands and is hit by a truck. Will goes home, where Detective Rudeski (Joe Chrest) and Detective Green (Marcus Lyle Brown) arrest him for murdering the man, whose name is Alan Marsh. At the station, Will cannot get Green and Rudeski to believe anything he says.

The detectives' boss, Lieutenant Durgan (Xander Berkeley), wants to talk to Will alone. Durgan wants to play a game, asking Will to complete sentences. After a few rounds, Durgan asks, "A hungry rabbit..." to which Will responds "Jumps. A hungry rabbit jumps", signifying his connection to Simon's organization. Durgan lets Will go free, giving him 24 hours to get out of the city before Simon and his henchmen Scar (Irone Singleton) and Cancer (Wayne Pére) come looking for him.

Will runs, but he is looking for answers. He goes to a memorial for Alan, and finds out that the man was not a sex offender but actually an award-winning investigative reporter for the New Orleans Post, who was investigating the vigilante organization. Will now knows why Simon wanted Alan dead. Simon, Scar, and Cancer suddenly turn up. Scar chases Will out onto a busy street, but is accidentally killed by an SUV that hits and drags him.

Will goes to a storage facility that Alan used and finds a DVD describing some of the people in the group, along with their missions. Will explains what is happening to Laura, who says she would have done the same had their situations been reversed. Will then tells Laura his whereabouts, advising her to stay away from the cops and anyone else who is asking questions.

Will learns that Simon's real name is Eugene Cook and that Jimmy joined the organization years ago, after his brother was murdered and the cops were unable to find the killer. Will sends Cook a clip of video by phone, showing that he has the DVD and what it contains. Cook agrees to a trade where Will will receive the security camera footage proving his innocence in Alan's death, as he was acting out of self-defense, in exchange for the DVD. Will agrees, and they agree to meet at the Louisiana Superdome, during a monster truck show.

At the dome, Will is told that Laura has been kidnapped and he is shown a photo of Laura gagged with tape as an extra incentive to make him give up the DVD. They go to a nearby mall, abandoned since Hurricane Katrina. Jimmy, Cancer, and a man called Sideburns (Dikran Tulaine) are holding Laura at gunpoint, with her hands tied and duct tape over her mouth. Will gives up the DVD, but Cook reneges on the deal, saying that Will and Laura will both be killed to remove all threats to the organization. He orders them to be shot (only to be distracted by Will branding him an insane hypocrite, Cook enraged by this, rants over how "he" is at least making a difference compared to apathy of others).

Cancer is about to pull the trigger on a bound and tapegagged Laura when he is fatally shot by Jimmy, after which Will forces Sideburns down an inactive escalator, then through the glass at the bottom of the escalator. Sideburns is killed when a chunk of the glass impales his neck.

Jimmy says that they did not get into the organization to kill innocent people, with Cook and Jimmy exchanging gunfire, until Cook kills Jimmy with two shots to the chest (mockingly demanding if Jimmy is happy about their predicament). Laura removes the strip of duct tape gagging her mouth and flees with a gun in her hand. Cook catches her and throws her into a glass display case, causing her to drop the gun. Will arrives and begins beating up Cook, but both fall onto another escalator, rolling to the bottom. Laura, who has grabbed the gun that Cook forced her to drop, shoots Cook six times, killing him.

Happy to be alive, Will and Laura walk back up the escalator. Durgan arrives, asking who killed Cook. Will responds that it was him, but Durgan says that the way he sees it, the dead guys killed each other. There was no one else present. He goes down to arrange things so the evidence shows this.

With the DVD still in hand, Will is cleared of any wrongdoing. He decides to follow up on Alan's work by giving the DVD to Gibbs (Mike Pniewski), a reporter whom Will met at Alan's memorial. Thanking him, Gibbs says, "The hungry rabbit jumps, eh?" indicating to a surprised Will that Gibbs is also in the organization.

Cast
 Nicolas Cage as Will Gerard
 January Jones as Laura Gerard
 Guy Pearce as Simon/Eugene Cook
 Harold Perrineau as Jimmy
 Jennifer Carpenter as Trudy
 Xander Berkeley as Lieutenant Durgan
 IronE Singleton as Scar
 Cullen Moss as Jones
 Marcus Lyle Brown as Detective Green
 Dikran Tulaine as Sideburns

Box office
The film opened at #27 at the US box office, taking $249,912 during its first weekend. Seeking Justice has currently grossed $12.4 million worldwide.

Reception
Seeking Justice has received mixed reviews from critics. , the film holds a 28% approval rating on Rotten Tomatoes based on 79 reviews with an average rating of 4.52/10. The consensus states: "Seeking Justice is nothing more than a typical potboiler with another phoned-in performance from Nicolas Cage." The film earned a Razzie Award nomination for Cage as Worst Actor.

References

External links
 
 
 

2011 films
2011 action thriller films
2011 crime action films
2011 crime thriller films
2010s mystery thriller films
2011 independent films
American action thriller films
American crime action films
American crime thriller films
American mystery thriller films
American independent films
American chase films
British action thriller films
British crime action films
British crime thriller films
British independent films
British chase films
Films about miscarriage of justice
Films directed by Roger Donaldson
Films shot in New Orleans
Films produced by Ram Bergman
Films produced by Tobey Maguire
Films scored by J. Peter Robinson
English-language Italian films
Italian crime action films
Italian action thriller films
American rape and revenge films
2010s vigilante films
British vigilante films
American vigilante films
British rape and revenge films
2010s English-language films
2010s American films
2010s British films